Stenosarina is a genus of brachiopods belonging to the family Terebratulidae.

The species of this genus are found in New Zealand and Central Atlantic Ocean.

Species:

Stenosarina angustata 
Stenosarina crosnieri 
Stenosarina cuneata 
Stenosarina davidsoni 
Stenosarina globosa 
Stenosarina lata 
Stenosarina nitens 
Stenosarina oregonae 
Stenosarina parva

References

Brachiopod genera